Magic Adventures of Mumfie is a British animated children's television series and movie, inspired by the works of Katharine Tozer (1907-1943) with an original music score containing more than 22 songs. The series was created by Britt Allcroft, the creator of Thomas & Friends and its US debut, Shining Time Station, produced by The Britt Allcroft Company (then renamed to Gullane Entertainment, now owned by Mattel Television) and Quality Family Entertainment, narrated by American actor Patrick Breen and directed by John Laurence Collins, Mumfie was first seen in the United States on FOX from 1995 to 1996, as part of The Fox Cubhouse. The show also aired in the US as part of Ready Set Learn. 79 episodes were produced.

Episodes

Characters
 Mumfie – The main character of the story, Mumfie is an elephant who lives in a little cottage in the woods. He always expects mail but never receives any. One day he decides to go on an adventure and the first thing he sees is a bird who asks if he can brighten up a dull tree.
 Scarecrow – When Mumfie first met Scarecrow he was always in a field not ever moving until he set on the quest with him. Scarecrow is with Mumfie in all episodes.
 Pinkey the Flying Pig – Starting her first appearance in a farm where other pigs bully her, Pinkey is upset because she misses her mother so Scarecrow and Mumfie help her out.
 The Black Cat – A mysterious, magical cat who riddles Mumfie as he proceeds his journey. Disappearing and reappearing the black cat helps Mumfie in ways he doesn't expect. She has a niece who is a grey kitty.
 The Secretary – The villain of the story who wants the Queen of Night's jewel as his source of power to rule all.
 Whale – Whale is Mumfie, Scarecrow and Pinkey's Friend who helps them to get to the island because instead of internal organs inside him he has a glamorous, luxury room set with portholes, hammocks, carpets, and lights.
 Pinkey's mother – Pinkey wanted to see her mother with Mumfie and Scarecrow only to find that she didn't want her to get caught by the secretary.
 Bristle – At first a servant to the secretary Bristle is very strict about rules as he explains to Mumfie. When the secretary was defeated, he became loyal to the Queen of Night instead.
 Napoleon – Napoleon is the bird who is kept a prisoner by the secretary. He had his feathers cut off a long time ago and, believing he couldn't fly anymore went into deep depression, until Pinkey made him understood after all these years they have grown back which persuades him to fly.
 The Queen of Night – The queen was the ruler of the island which Mumfie goes to. She is undercover as the secretary wants her jewel to rule all. She is voiced by Britt Allcroft instead of Breen due to his inability to speak in a female voice.
 Mr and Mrs Admiral – These two married people were having a dream of living an underwater house (despite the fact that humans can't breathe underwater) until one day, when Mr Admiral was kidnapped by Davy Jones and his pirates which was a big blow to Mrs Admiral.
 Eel – Mumfie first met Eel in the cave that lead them to the pirates and Davy Jones because she was glowing in the dark.
 Davy Jones – Davy Jones is the leader of the pirates (who lived in their underwater ship) when he left he decided to be whale's companion.
 Pirates – These pirates served Davy Jones when they kept Mr Admiral a prisoner until they became good guys.
 Youare the Reindeer – Youare is the reindeer character with twisted antlers whose first appearance was in "Mumfie's White Christmas". Despite the fact that "You are?" was a question that was asked to him in Santa's stables, he assumed that was his name.

Production

Tozer's novels are:

 The Wanderings of Mumfie (1935)
 Here Comes Mumfie (1936)
 Mumfie's the Admiral (1937)
 Mumfie's Magic Box (1938)
 Mumfie's Uncle Samuel (1939)
 Mumfie's Marches On (1942)

They were first adapted for television as Here Comes Mumfie, using puppetry, between 1975 and 1976 and broadcast on Independent Television (ITV) in the United Kingdom. Allcroft's newly created version, with an original musical score featuring 26 Broadway style songs, was broadcast on the Children's ITV block of UK's ITV network in 1994 and has since been broadcast in other countries, including the United States (on Fox Kids), Canada, Australia, France, Scandinavia, Finland, Germany, Japan, and Israel.

The screen library consists of Series 1 (originally a 13x10 minute serial, later edited into the movie length epic story Mumfie's Quest), the Holiday Special Mumfie's White Christmas and Series 2 totaling 62 individual story episodes. After the sale of The Britt Allcroft Company in 2002, Mumfie became owned by HIT Entertainment. In 2009, Britt Allcroft bought back all the screen library, all the assets and underlying rights. Her family owned business, Britt Allcroft Productions LLV, recently announced a home entertainment distribution deal for the Mumfie screen library with Lionsgate for the U.S., U.K, and many other parts of the world. They also had a partnership with United Talent Agency to handle all licensing for the Mumfie brand worldwide.

Prospective reboot

In May 2014, Britt Allcroft stated that she had begun production on a reboot of Mumfie. In July 2015, it was revealed that the kids' division of Zodiak Entertainment, which was behind shows such as Zack & Quack and Totally Spies!, had begun development of the show, with Britt Allcroft Productions.

In 2020, the series was announced to premiere in 2021, and would be animated by Italian animation studio Animoka. The series, which is now set on an island named Flutterstone, has new designs for pre-existing characters from the original series to make them look more in line with Tozer's books (including Mumfie being shorter, with a smaller trunk and ears and actual hands and Pinkey now having a flower near her left ear) as well as new characters such as a jellyfish named Jelly Bean (who, due to the new setting, replaces Scarecrow as a central character) and a crocodile named King Kaleb (to whom the Black Cat is now the advisor of). In 2022, it was announced that the series had been pre-sold to many networks overseas, including the original broadcaster, ITV.

Home media

VHS releases

DVD releases

Critical reception
During its original run, Britt Allcroft's Magic Adventures of Mumfie received positive reviews from critics. The Chicago Tribune called the show "a moving work of art", while the New York Daily News described the show as "gentle, smart and beautifully animated".

Video game
An edutainment game based on animated series of same name, was released for the Sega Pico in 1995 and was developed and published by Konami.

References

External links
Mumfie on Internet Movie Database

1990s British animated television series
1994 British television series debuts
1998 British television series endings
British children's animated fantasy television series
British children's animated musical television series
English-language television shows
ITV children's television shows
British television shows based on children's books
Television series by Mattel Creations
Television series created by Britt Allcroft
Animated television series about elephants
Gullane Entertainment